The  is a professional wrestling title in Japanese promotion Pro Wrestling Noah, contested exclusively among junior heavyweight (<100 kg) wrestlers. It was created in 2001 when Yoshinobu Kanemaru defeated Juventud Guerrera in a 12-man tournament final. In addition to Japan, the title has also been defended in the United States, United Kingdom and Germany. , there have been a total of 52 reigns shared between 26 different champions. The current champion is Amakusa, who is in his first reign.

Tournament
Noah held a 10-man tournament to crown the first champion, held over its month-long, 11-event Navigation for the Bright Destination tour. The tour was held from June 9 through June 24, 2001.

Title history

Combined reigns

Belt design
The standard Championship belt has three plates on a blue leather strap.

See also
GHC Heavyweight Championship
GHC National Championship
GHC Tag Team Championship
GHC Junior Heavyweight Tag Team Championship
GHC Hardcore Tag Team Championship

References

External links
 GHC Junior Heavyweight Championship

Pro Wrestling Noah championships
Junior heavyweight wrestling championships